Waretini is an album by Deane Waretini which features his hit single "The Bridge".

Background
The Album was released by CBS in 1981. The single, "The Bridge" which is on track 1, side 1 of the album was the biggest New Zealand single of the year and the first for a song in Maori language to be at the top of the charts. It also charted in Australia.
By July 26, 1981, the album was at no 13 in the New Zealand album charts.

Track listing

Additional personnel
 Trumpet on "The Bridge" - Kevin Furey
 Background vocals - The Yandall Sisters

References

1981 debut albums
CBS Records albums
Deane Waretini albums
Māori music